The Shanwang National Geology Park is located in central Shandong province, People's Republic of China, about  from Linqu County. The Park is well known for its fossil bearing diatomitic deposits, one of only a few such deposits in China. It is also well known for its volcanic topography.

Fossils

The fossils are found in the Miocene Shanwang Formation diatomite beds and are approximately 17 million years old. They are noted for the prolific number of specimens found and the diversity of the species recovered, as well as the remarkable state of their preservation. The fine grained diatomite strata have led to exquisite preservation of external body features such as outlines of skin, hair, scales and feathers, rarely seen elsewhere in the world. Fossils have been found in a dozen categories, representing over 600 separate species. Animal fossils include insects, fish, spiders, amphibians, reptiles, birds and mammals. Insect fossils have clear, intact veins. Some have retained beautiful colours. Those studied to date include 11 orders, 46 families, 100 genera and 182 species. Fossil birds recovered at Shanwang are the most abundant and best-preserved found so far in China. Fossils of ancient deer and bear are among the best-preserved from this period of time found anywhere in the world. Plant fossils include moss, fern, gymnosperm, and angiosperm species. In addition to 100 species of algae, other plant species are from 46 families, 98 genera and 143 species.

References

Parks in Shandong
Geography of Shandong
Tourist attractions in Shandong